Arc Vehicle is a British electric motorcycle manufacturer. Operating out of their headquarters based in Coventry, England.

Their Halo product is the Arc Vector Electric Motorcycle. The Vector was initially debuted at EICMA Milan, the world’s largest motorcycle show, subsequently with the UK launch coming soon after at Motorcycle Live, Birmingham NEC. The launch drew worldwide interest and attention with over 450 articles written by media outlets across 50 countries.

The Arc Vector is now in full-scale production, with first customer bikes being shipped off to customers in September 2022.

References

External links

Motorcycle manufacturers of the United Kingdom
Companies based in Warwickshire
British companies established in 2017
Vehicle manufacturing companies established in 2018